The women's hammer throw event at the 2010 World Junior Championships in Athletics was held in Moncton, New Brunswick, Canada, at Moncton Stadium on 22 and 24 July.

Medalists

Results

Final
24 July

Qualifications
22 July

Group A

Group B

Participation
According to an unofficial count, 34 athletes from 26 countries participated in the event.

References

Hammer throw
Hammer throw at the World Athletics U20 Championships
2010 in women's athletics